Tarik Cohen (born July 26, 1995) is an American football running back who is a free agent. Cohen played the same position for North Carolina Agricultural & Technical State University before being selected in the fourth round of the 2017 NFL Draft.

Early life
Cohen attended Bunn High School in his hometown of Bunn, North Carolina, excelling at football and track & field for the Wildcats athletic teams. As a senior, he helped lead the Wildcats to a 9–3 record and a third-round finish in the 2011 NCHSAA 2A playoffs. In his two years on the varsity team, he rushed for a total 808 yards, including 252 earned in a single game. He earned team MVP and all-conference honors in football and state championships in Track as he was part of the North Carolina High School Athletic Association Class 2A state champion 4×100 meter relay team.

College career
Cohen's size was a point of concern to many schools interested in recruiting him for football. As a result, North Carolina A&T was the only Division I school to offer Cohen a football scholarship, which he accepted.

2013 season

As a freshman, starting in six of the 11 games played in the 2013 season,  Cohen was positioned as a part of a group of freshmen players poised to take over the Aggie program after senior running backs Ricky Lewis and Dominique Drake graduated. Since Lewis would, however, get injured, and Drake was sidelined with a concussion, Cohen was able to prove his value in the October 12 game against Hampton. In that game, Cohen carried the ball 22 times for 180 yards and a touchdown. Cohen followed up his performance two weeks later with 32 carries for 210 yards and three touchdowns against Florida A&M. Cohen completed his freshman season leading the Mid-Eastern Athletic Conference (MEAC) with 1,148 rushing yards and the conference's rookie of the year honors. Cohen's performance made him the first A&T freshman to break the 1,000 yard mark and only the third freshman in MEAC history to do so.

2014 season

Cohen began his sophomore season with three consecutive 100+ rushing yard games, rushing for 161 yards in the season opener against Alabama A&M, 133 yards against Coastal Carolina, and a career-best 234 yards against Elon. Cohen also posted 236 all-purpose yards (155 rushing and 81 receiving), in the October 9 game against Hampton and closed the season with 203 yards against arch rival North Carolina Central. Cohen finished the 2014 season with 1,340 rushing yards and 15 touchdowns, both being the second-highest single-season totals in A&T history. Cohen also earned MEAC co-offensive player of the year, along with All-American recognition from SBN, BoxtoRow, and Stats FCS.

2015 season

In the summer before the 2015 season, a YouTube video of Cohen completing catches while simultaneously doing backflips became popular across multiple social media platforms and led to an appearance on ESPN's SportsCenter where he demonstrated the catches on live television. Cohen's 2015 season was highlighted by a number of record-setting performances including a career-best 295 yards, and offensive MVP recognition, at the 2015 Celebration Bowl. Cohen's other accomplishments from the season include: multiple single-season school records with 1,543 total rushing yards, 264 carries and 15 touchdowns, equaling the record he set the season before. Cohen also earned MEAC Offensive Player of the year for the second consecutive year, along with all-American recognition from College Sporting News, Sheridan Broadcasting Network, BoxtoRow, and Stats FCS. Cohen was also the SBN Offensive Player of the Year.

2016 season

Cohen began his final collegiate season by breaking a number of school records. In the 2016 season opener against Division II St. Augustine's, Cohen's two touchdowns put him over the record for receiving and rushing touchdowns at 42. In the September 29, 2016, game against Division I FBS Kent State, Cohen would continue breaking records as his 256-yard and three-touchdown performance broke both Stoney Polite's 41 career rushing touchdown record and James White's 25-year record for longest run from scrimmage at 89 yards. In the October 15, 2016, game against Bethune-Cookman, Cohen became the first player in school history to rush for at least 200 yards in three consecutive games. Cohen's A&T career would end with him becoming the MEAC's all-time leading rusher with 5,619 yards. Cohen's performance also made him the first player in school history to pass the 5,000 career rushing yard mark.  Cohen ended his final season as the first player in MEAC history to be named conference offensive player of the year for 3 consecutive seasons. His performance would also make him the MEAC's all-time leading rusher, and the first player in school history to break the 5,000-yard mark. On the national level, Cohen was placed on the watch lists for national awards such as the Deacon Jones Trophy, which he won, and the Walter Payton Award, where he ultimately finished fifth in the voting. Cohen also earned All-American recognition from several national organizations and media outlets including: the NCAA, STATS FCS and BoxToRow. He was also named to the 2016 Walter Camp Football Championship Subdivision All-American team and he was named a second-team AFCA Football Championship Subdivision Coaches’ All-American selection. In addition to setting new School and Conference rushing yardage records, Cohen further cemented his legacy by breaking the single-season touchdown record with 19 and tying the school record for the single-season rushing touchdowns record with 18. He also holds other school records including rushing touchdowns, total touchdowns, and total points at 56, 59, and 339 respectively. Cohen closed his college career by playing in the 2017 NFLPA Collegiate Bowl.

College statistics

Professional career

According to Alex Marvez of the Sporting News, Cohen had been in talks with, and also worked out for, a number of teams going into the 2017 NFL Draft including the Philadelphia Eagles, New York Jets, Chicago Bears, Denver Broncos, and Green Bay Packers. Cohen's size and abilities drew many comparisons to Darren Sproles, and he was projected to be a sixth round pick in the upcoming draft. Cohen was among the 330 NFL hopefuls invited to participate in the 2017 NFL Scouting Combine.

2017
Cohen was drafted by the Chicago Bears in the fourth round, 119th overall, of the 2017 NFL Draft. He was the tenth running back to be selected in the 2017 NFL Draft.  In addition, he was the first player from North Carolina A&T to be selected since offensive lineman Junius Coston was selected in the fifth round of the 2005 NFL Draft by the Green Bay Packers. He was one of three non-FBS players taken by the Bears in the draft, the first time since 2002 that the team took three non-FBS players in a single draft.

In the 2017 season, Cohen shared the backfield with Jordan Howard. On September 10, 2017, in his NFL debut, Cohen finished the game with five carries for 66 yards and eight receptions for 47 yards and a touchdown in a 23–17 home loss to the Atlanta Falcons at Soldier Field. In Week 3, a 23–17 overtime victory over the Pittsburgh Steelers, he had 12 carries for 78 yards and four receptions for 24 yards. On October 15, against the Baltimore Ravens, Cohen threw a 21-yard touchdown pass to tight end Zach Miller, making him the shortest player to throw a touchdown since Wee Willie Smith, who also stood at  when he threw a touchdown in 1934. Cohen recorded the first rushing touchdown of his career against the New Orleans Saints at the Mercedes-Benz Superdome during Week 8. On December 3, Cohen returned a punt against the San Francisco 49ers for a 61-yard touchdown in the 15–14 loss in Week 13. He was the second rookie since Gale Sayers in 1965 to record a rushing, passing, receiving, and punt return touchdown. Overall, in his rookie season, Cohen finished with 370 rushing yards, two rushing touchdowns, 358 receiving yards, one receiving touchdown, and one passing touchdown.

2018

Cohen continued to share the backfield with Howard going into the 2018 season. In Week 4 of the 2018 season, Cohen recorded seven receptions for a career-high 121 receiving yards in the 48–10 victory over the Tampa Bay Buccaneers. On October 14, 2018, Cohen  rushed in a 21-yard touchdown and had seven receptions for 90 yards against the Miami Dolphins. In Week 8 against the New York Jets, Cohen rushed five times for 40 yards and had one catch for 70 yards and a touchdown in the 24–10 victory.

In Week 13 against the New York Giants, Cohen rushed for 30 yards and had 12 catches for 156 yards. On the final play of regulation, with the Bears down by seven points, Cohen was involved in a trick play to tie the game: at the Giants' one-yard line, quarterback Chase Daniel handed off to tight end Trey Burton, who lateraled the ball to Cohen. Noticing Daniel was covered, Cohen threw a pass to Anthony Miller for the touchdown. The Bears eventually lost 30–27 in overtime, but Cohen became the first player ever with at least 30 rushing yards, 150 receiving yards, and a passing touchdown in a game; his 156 receiving yards were the most by a Bears running back since at least 1960.

Cohen finished the season with 444 rushing yards and three touchdowns to go along with 71 catches for 725 receiving yards and five receiving touchdowns, along with a league-leading 411 punt return yards. He was later named to the 2019 Pro Bowl roster and first-team All-Pro as a return specialist.  Fellow teammates Khalil Mack, Eddie Jackson, and Kyle Fuller were also named first-team All-Pro. He received an overall grade of 71.6 from Pro Football Focus in 2018, which ranked as the 32nd highest grade among all qualifying running backs. The Bears won the NFC North and earned the #3-seed for the NFC Playoffs. In the Wild Card Round, against the Philadelphia Eagles, Cohen had three receptions for 27 yards in his playoff debut, a 16–15 loss.

2019
In Week 4 against the Minnesota Vikings, Cohen rushed five times for 11 yards and caught two passes for seven yards and his first receiving touchdown of the season in the 16–6 win. Overall, Cohen finished the 2019 season with 64 carries for 213 rushing yards to go along with 79 receptions for 456 receiving yards and three receiving touchdowns.

2020
On September 20, 2020, Cohen signed a three-year, $17.25 million contract extension with the Bears. In Week 3 against the Atlanta Falcons, Cohen was tackled on a punt return and suffered tears to his ACL and MCL, as well as a tibial plateau fracture. He was placed on injured reserve two days after the game.

2021–2022
Cohen was placed on the reserve/physically unable to perform to start the season. He missed the entire 2021 season while recovering from the ACL injury he sustained the previous season.

The Bears released Cohen on March 16, 2022.

On May 17, Cohen suffered a torn Achilles tendon during a training session which was being livestreamed from his Instagram account.

NFL career statistics

Personal life
On May 9, 2021, Cohen's twin brother Tyrell was found dead at a Duke Power substation in Raleigh, North Carolina. His younger brother Dante died in a car accident in April 2022.

References

External links
 
 Twitter
 North Carolina A&T Aggies bio

1995 births
Living people
American football running backs
American football return specialists
Chicago Bears players
North Carolina A&T Aggies football players
North Carolina A&T Aggies men's track and field athletes
People from Franklin County, North Carolina
Players of American football from North Carolina
National Conference Pro Bowl players
Ed Block Courage Award recipients
Brian Piccolo Award winners